"Put It There" is a 1990 single from Paul McCartney's 1989 album, Flowers in the Dirt. The song reached number 32 on the UK singles chart. The lyrics were inspired by an expression of friendship and solace that McCartney learned from his father, "Put it there [handshake] if it weighs a ton."

Overview

Like other songs from Flowers in the Dirt, despite the song's modest chart success, to date "Put It There" has not been included yet on any McCartney compilation album.

The 7" single also included "Mama's Little Girl", a Wings song that had been originally recorded in 1972 but had been remixed and produced in its current version in 1987 by McCartney and Chris Thomas.

The 12" single included "Same Time Next Year", a second Wings song which had been recorded on 5 and 6 May 1978 at RAK Studios, as a possible theme for the film Same Time, Next Year. It had also been remixed and produced in 1987 by McCartney and Thomas.

The 12" single was also released as limited edition (12 RS6246) with an art print from the cover illustration. 
The cover illustration was drawn by McCartney.

According to the liner notes from Geoff Baker, the song was issued as single because of the Parisian crowd from the concerts at the Palais Omnisports in October 1989, as the girls were grabbing partners and bobbing to "Put It There".

"Put It There" is also the name of an hour-long documentary on the making of Flowers in the Dirt, produced by Chips Chipperfield and directed by Geoff Wonfor (who later made The Beatles Anthology), originally released in September 1989 and later included on the 2017 remastered version of the album.

Track listing 
This song was released on 5 February 1990 as a cassette single, a 7" single, a 12" maxi-single, and a CD single.

Cassette single 
 "Put It There"
 "Mama's Little Girl"

7" single
 "Put It There"
 "Mama's Little Girl"

12" single
 "Put It There"
 "Mama's Little Girl"
 "Same Time Next Year"

CD single
 "Put It There"
 "Mama's Little Girl"
 "Same Time Next Year"

Charts

References

Paul McCartney songs
Songs written by Paul McCartney
1989 songs
Music published by MPL Music Publishing